Bruce James Quick (born 4 October 1959 in Sydney, New South Wales) is an Australian sport shooter. Since 1988, Quick had won a total of forty three medals (twenty seven gold, six  silver, and nine bronze) in the rapid fire, centre fire, standard pistol, 50m pistol and Air pistol at the Oceanian Shooting Championships. He also captured a bronze medal in the  rapid fire pistol pairs, along with his partner David Chapman at the 2010 Commonwealth Games in Delhi, India, with a combined score of 1,125 points.

Quick has competed at the 1990, 1998, 2002, 2006, 2010, 2014 and 2018 Commonwealth games, making him the Australian Commonwealth team member with the most appearances as an athlete,  winning a total of 14 medals - 1 gold, 9 silver and 4 bronze medals. Quick made his official debut for the 2004 Summer Olympics in Athens, where he competed in the men's 25 m rapid fire pistol. He finished only in last place out of seventeen shooters by one point behind North Korea's Kim Hyon-Ung, with a total score of 571 targets (283 in the first stage and 288 in the second).

Four years after competing in his last Olympics, Quick qualified for his second Australian team, as a 47-year-old, at the 2008 Summer Olympics in Beijing, by winning the rapid fire pistol from the 2005 Oceanian Shooting Championships, coincidentally in Brisbane, with a score of 754.3 points. Quick hit a total of 560 targets (280 each on the first and second stage) in the preliminary rounds of the men's 25 m rapid fire pistol, finishing again in seventeenth place, second last, one position higher from his last olympics and two points ahead of Hong Kong's Wong Fai.

References

External links
Profile – Australian Olympic Team
NBC Olympics Profile

Australian male sport shooters
Living people
Olympic shooters of Australia
Shooters at the 2004 Summer Olympics
Shooters at the 2008 Summer Olympics
Shooters at the 1990 Commonwealth Games
Shooters at the 1998 Commonwealth Games
Shooters at the 2002 Commonwealth Games
Shooters at the 2006 Commonwealth Games
Shooters at the 2010 Commonwealth Games
Shooters at the 2014 Commonwealth Games
Shooters at the 2018 Commonwealth Games
Commonwealth Games bronze medallists for Australia
Sportsmen from New South Wales
1959 births
Sportspeople from Sydney
Commonwealth Games medallists in shooting
20th-century Australian people
21st-century Australian people
Medallists at the 1990 Commonwealth Games
Medallists at the 1998 Commonwealth Games
Medallists at the 2002 Commonwealth Games
Medallists at the 2006 Commonwealth Games
Medallists at the 2010 Commonwealth Games